Frank Mason may refer to:

Sports
 Frank Mason III (born 1994), American basketball player
 Frank Mason (cricketer) (born 1926), West Indian cricketer
 Frank A. Mason (1862–1940), American football coach and attorney
 Frank Mason (jockey) (1879–1969), English horse racing jockey

Others
 Frank Mason or Algis Budrys (1931–2008),  Lithuanian-American science-fiction author
 Frank Henry Mason (1875–1965), English painter
 Frank Herbert Mason (1921–2009), American painter